Denny Andreína Méndez de la Rosa  (born 20 July 1978 in Santo Domingo, Dominican Republic) is a Dominican-Italian actress, model and beauty queen who represented Italy in Miss Universe 1997 and placed in the top six.

Early life
A native of the Dominican Republic, Méndez relocated to Montecatini Terme, Italy, as a very young child with her mother in search of a better life. Many of Méndez's aunts had relocated to Italy and had married Italian citizens, and after divorcing Denny's biological father, her mother relocated to Italy and married an Italian man whom she met while he was on vacation in the Dominican Republic. Méndez, who had no formal training as a model, was studying to become a tourist guide before enrolling in the pageant.

Miss Italy 1996
Her first venture in the beauty pageant circuit occurred when she was a candidate for in the title of Miss Dominican Republic 1996 on 16 December 1995, when she represented the Distrito Nacional and placed second runner-up. After another attempt to win the title the following year, she decided to return to Italy where she entered the Miss Italia pageant.

Her election as Miss Italia on 7 September 1996 in the Italian town of Salsomaggiore caused a minor scandal throughout that nation. It was the first time that a woman of non-Italian ancestry was elected to represent the country in an international beauty pageant and some Italian citizens saw it as a wake-up call for Italy to close its borders to further immigration. Two members of the judging panel were suspended for saying that a black woman could not represent Italian beauty. The news of the first black Miss Italy was carried to millions overseas via the popular African-American periodical Jet magazine. The author of the article was quoted in American Outlook:

Upon being elected Miss Italia, Méndez responded to the controversy with a brief reply:

Denny was selected as one of the 10 semifinalists in Miss Universe 1997 in Miami Beach, Florida, U.S. on 16 May 1997. Despite winning the semifinals with the highest overall score and entering the top six in first place, her interview answer was not enough to advance her to the final three. The crown was eventually won by Miss USA Brook Mahealani Lee. But the publicity from the pageant helped her land modeling jobs among many of Europe's leading fashion houses and magazines.

Post-pageant career
Today, Méndez is a popular television personality in Italy. She remains very active in the modeling world and has become an actress. Besides several theatrical productions, she has guest starred on many Italian sitcoms, dramas, and feature films; she also had a small role in the film Ocean's Twelve, which starred George Clooney, Brad Pitt, and Matt Damon. In 2022, she was nominated for Actress Universe 2022 award for her performance in the short film Red Roses Never Die.

References

External links
 Official Website 
 
 Denny Méndez Pictorial 

1978 births
Beauty pageant controversies
Dominican Republic emigrants to Italy
Italian beauty pageant winners
Italian female models
Italian film actresses
Italian television actresses
Living people
Miss Universe 1997 contestants